Adena High School is a public high school located in Frankfort, Ohio.  It is the only high school in the Adena Local School District.

Athletics

Scioto Valley Conference
 Bainbridge Paint Valley Bearcats
 Chillicothe Unioto Shermans 
 Kinnikinnick Zane Trace Pioneers
 Frankfort Adena Warriors
 Huntington Ross Huntington Huntsmen
 Piketon Redstreaks
 Richmond Dale/Londonderry Southeastern Panthers
 Williamsport Westfall Mustangs

See also Ohio High School Athletic Conferences

Ohio High School Athletic Association State Championships

 Girls Track and Field - 1975
 Boys Track and Field - 1972

References

External links
 

High schools in Ross County, Ohio
Public high schools in Ohio